Sacrifice is an EP by American heavy metal band Danzig. It was released in 1996 on Hollywood Records and reissued in 2000 on Evilive Records/E-Magine Records.

Critical reception
Exclaim! wrote that "the Sacrifice EP should only be of interest to rabid fans, an extension only for to  those who understood [Danzig's] ultra-techno-dabbling."

Track listing 

1996 Hollywood Records version
 "Sacrifice" - 4:28
 "Blackacidevil" - 4:24
 "Don't Be Afraid" - 4:27

1996 original version

 "Sacrifice (Rust Mix)" - 3:46
 "Sacrifice (Trust Mix)" - 3:46
 "Sacrifice (Must Mix)" - 6:26
 "Sacrifice (Crust Mix)" - 6:28
 "Sacrifice (Martyr Mix)" - 6:20
 "Sacrifice (Album Version)" - 4:28

2000 reissue version

 "Sacrifice (Rust Mix)" - 3:46
 "Sacrifice (Trust Mix)" - 3:46
 "Sacrifice (Must Mix)" - 6:26
 "Sacrifice (Crust Mix)" - 6:28
 "Sacrifice (Martyr Mix)" - 6:20
 "Sacrifice (Album Version)" - 4:28
 "Deepest (Kennedy Acid Death Mix)" - 4:54
 "Deeper Still (French Eric Cadieaux Techno Mix)" - 6:50
 "Serpentia (Winter Mix)" - 7:01

All songs written by Glenn Danzig.

Production 
Tracks 1–4 perpetrated by JG Thirlwell, engineered by Rob Sutton.
Tracks 5 and 9 remixed by Joseph Bishara.
Track 6 produced by Glenn Danzig, engineered and mixed by Bill Kennedy.
Track 7 remixed by Bill Kennedy.
Track 8 remixed by "French Eric" Cadieaux.

References

1996 albums
Danzig (band) albums